Pope Eutychian, also called Eutychianus, was the bishop of Rome from 4 January 275 to his death on 7 December 283.

Eutychian's original epitaph was discovered in the catacomb of Callixtus (see Kraus, Roma sotterranea, p. 154 et seq.), but almost nothing more is known of him. Even the date of his reign is uncertain. Liber Pontificalis gives a reign of 8 years and 11 months, from 275 to 283. Eusebius, on the other hand says his reign was only 10 months.

Eutychian is said to have allowed the blessing of grapes and beans on the altar and to have buried 324 martyrs with his own hands. Some historians doubt these traditions, but others assert that persecutions continued until the Edict of Serdica was proclaimed in 311 by Emperor Galerius making Christianity a legal and acceptable religion. The blessing of produce of the fields is believed by some, to belong to a later period, but this cannot be verified.

Eutychian's feast day is 8 December.

See also

List of Catholic saints
List of popes

References

External links

Sanctus Eutychianus at Documenta Catholica Omnia

283 deaths
3rd-century archbishops
3rd-century Christian saints
3rd-century Romans
Papal saints
Popes
Year of birth unknown
3rd-century popes